

Papua New Guinea at the 1994 Commonwealth Games was abbreviated PNG.

1994 Commonwealth Games Medal Count|Medals

Gold
 none

Silver
 National team—Bowls, Women's Fours

Bronze
 none

1994
1994 in Papua New Guinean sport
Nations at the 1994 Commonwealth Games